Find and replace may refer to:
 a feature of text processing as found:
 in text editors
 in formal language theory
 in particular programming languages
 Find and Replace (audio drama)

See also 
 Regular expressions
 String searching algorithms  
 replace (command), an MS DOS command